Jean-Pierre Auguste Dalmas House is a historic home located in Valdese, Burke County, North Carolina.  It was built between 1929 and 1948, and is a 3-story, banked frame dwelling with a river rock and fieldstone foundation and veneer. It was constructed by a Waldensian immigrant from Northern Italy, Jean-Pierre Dalmas (1878-1972).

It was listed on the National Register of Historic Places in 2002.

References

Italian-American culture in North Carolina
Waldensianism
Houses on the National Register of Historic Places in North Carolina
Houses completed in 1948
Houses in Burke County, North Carolina
National Register of Historic Places in Burke County, North Carolina